Mollaret is a surname. Notable people with the surname include: 

Axelle Mollaret (born 1992), French skyrunner and ski mountaineer
Pierre Mollaret (1898–1987), French neurologist